Platycheirus immarginatus is a species of hoverfly. It is found in parts of northern Europe and northern North America.

Description
External images
For terms, see: Morphology of Diptera. Femora 1 has subbasal tuft of 2-3 long white hairs and 6 dorsal long black bristles. Tibiae 1 is gradually increasing in width, with a slight
bend beyond middle.
See references for determination.

Distribution
Palearctic: Britain, Ireland, Sweden, Denmark, the Netherlands and Belgium. Nearctic: Alaska south to California.

Biology
Habitat: wetland; freshwater coastal marshes, fen blanket bog, cut-over raised bog, taiga wetlands. It flies May to September.

References

External links
Images representing Platycheirus immarginatus

Diptera of Europe
Diptera of North America
Syrphinae
Insects described in 1849